Domninus of Larissa was an ancient Hellenistic Syrian mathematician.

Life 

Domninus of Larissa, Syria was, simultaneously with Proclus, a pupil of Syrianus. Domninus is said to have corrupted the doctrines of Plato by mixing up with them his private opinions. This called forth a treatise from Proclus, intended as a statement of the genuine principles of Platonism. Marinus writes about a rivalry between Domninus and Proclus about how Plato's work should be interpreted,
[Syrianus] offered to discourse to them on either the Orphic theories or the oracles; but Domninus wanted Orphism, Proclus the oracles, and they had not agreed when Syrianus died...
The Athenian academy eventually choose Proclus' interpretation over Domninus' and Proclus would later become the head of the Academy. After Proclus' promotion, Domninus left Athens and returned to Larissa.

It is said that once when Domninus was ill and coughing up blood, he took to eating copious amounts of pork, despite the fact that he was Jewish, because a physician prescribed it as a treatment. He is also said to have taught Asclepiodotus, until Asclepiodotus became so argumentative that Domninus no longer admitted him into his company.

Works 
Domninus is remembered for authoring a Manual of Introductory Arithmetic, which was edited by Boissonade and had two articles by Tannery written about it.  The Manual of Introductory Arithmetic was a concise and well arranged overview of the theory of numbers. It covered numbers, proportions and means. It is important since it is a reaction against Nicomachus' Introductio arithmetica and a return to the doctrine of Euclid.

Domninus is also believed to have authored a tract entitled how a ratio can be taken out of a ratio, which studies the manipulation of ratios into other forms.  Bulmer-Thomas believe that it was written, at least in part, by Domninus, but Heath casts some doubt on the authorship by stating that if it wasn't written by Domninus then it at least comes from the same period as him.  Domninus may have also written a work entitled Elements of Arithmetic as referred to near the end of his Manual of Introductory Arithmetic, although whether or not he ever wrote this book is unknown.

See also 

 Heliodorus of Larissa

Citations and footnotes

References 

 Ivor Bulmer-Thomas, Biography in Dictionary of Scientific Biography (New York 1970-1990).
Peter Brown, The Manual of Domninus in Harvard Review of Philosophy (2000)

External links 
 

5th-century philosophers
Ancient Greek mathematicians
Syrian mathematicians
Neoplatonists
5th-century Jews
Ancient Roman philosophers
Hellenistic Jewish writers
420 births
480 deaths
5th-century Byzantine writers
5th-century mathematicians
5th-century Byzantine scientists